Phillip Kiplimo (born 24 March 1991 in Chemonges Square, Kapchorwa) is a Ugandan long-distance runner.

He made his half marathon debut in Kampala in 2012 and ran the distance under one hour and two minutes. He placed seventh at the Zwolle Half Marathon in 2013 and placed fourth on his marathon debut at the 2014 Linz Marathon, running a time of 2:14:14 hours. Despite his lack of international experience, he was selected to represent Uganda in the marathon at the 2014 Commonwealth Games. He managed an eighth-place finish at the 2014 Commonwealth games marathon

References

External links

Living people
1991 births
Ugandan male long-distance runners
Ugandan male marathon runners
People from Kapchorwa District
Athletes (track and field) at the 2014 Commonwealth Games
Commonwealth Games competitors for Uganda
Ugandan mountain runners
World Mountain Running Championships winners
21st-century Ugandan people